The University of Tennessee at Chattanooga (UT-Chattanooga, UTC, or Chattanooga) is a public university in Chattanooga, Tennessee, United States. It was founded in 1886 and is one of four universities and two other affiliated institutions in the University of Tennessee System.

History

UTC was founded in 1886 as the then-private and racially exclusive Chattanooga University, which was soon merged in 1889 with the Athens-based Grant Memorial University (now Tennessee Wesleyan University), becoming the Chattanooga campus of U.S. Grant Memorial University.  In 1907, the school changed its name to University of Chattanooga. In 1964 the university merged with Zion College, which had been established in 1949 and later became Chattanooga City College. In 1969 the University of Chattanooga joined the UT system and became the University of Tennessee at Chattanooga.

The University of Chattanooga Foundation Inc. is a private corporation, created in 1969, that manages the private endowment of the University of Tennessee at Chattanooga.

Administration
UTC uses the semester system, with five optional "mini-terms" in the summer.  The leadership of the campus rests upon the chancellor, who answers to the UT System President. The university is currently headed by Chancellor Dr. Steve Angle.

Leadership

The following people have had the post of President or Chancellor at the University of Tennessee at Chattanooga (UTC). Prior to 1969, the institution was known as the University of Chattanooga (1907–1969), U.S. Grant University (1889–1907), and Chattanooga University (1886–1889). At the time of UTC's establishment in 1969, the name of the leader became chancellor instead of president.

Chattanooga University
Rev. Edward S. Lewis, President 1886-1889
U.S. Grant University 
Rev. John F. Spence, Chancellor 1889–1891; President 1891–1893
Bishop Isaac W. Joyce, Chancellor 1891–1896
University of Chattanooga 
Rev. John H. Race, President 1897–1914
Rev. Fred W. Hixson, President 1914–1920
Rev. Arlo A. Brown, President 1921–1929
Dr. Alexander Guerry, President 1929–1938
Dr. Archie M. Palmer, President 1938–1942
Dr. David A. Lockmiller, President 1942–1959
Dr. LeRoy A. Martin, President 1959–1966
University of Tennessee at Chattanooga 
Dr. William H. Masterson, President 1966–1969; Chancellor 1970–1973
Dr. James E. Drinnon, Chancellor 1973–1981
Dr. Frederick W. Obear, Chancellor 1981–1997; Acting Chancellor 2004–2005.
Dr. Bill W. Stacy, Chancellor 1997–2004
Dr. Roger G. Brown, Chancellor 2005–2012
 Dr. E. Grady Bogue, Acting Chancellor 2012–2013
 Dr. Steve Angle, Chancellor 2013–present

Student Government Association of UTC
A voice for student leadership on campus, the SGA consists of an executive team, senators representing districts/colleges they belong to, a judicial branch, a Freshman Senate, and a Graduate Students Senate. The current president is Taylor Bradshaw with Wendy Jiang serving as vice president and Alex Spraker serving as treasurer.

Academics
Chattanooga is best known for its nationally ranked Business program, Engineering, Nursing, English, Chemistry, Accounting, Psychology, Music, and Education departments. The university offers over 140 undergraduate majors and concentrations, and over 50 undergraduate minors.  Chattanooga also offers nearly 100 graduate programs and concentrations, including a highly ranked master's program in Industrial and Organizational Psychology and PhD programs in Computational Engineering and Physical Therapy. In an effort to expand the horizons of its student body, UTC recently began an exchange program with Kangnung National University of Kangnung, South Korea.

Media and publications
Print
 University Echo – Student newspaper
 Moccasin – Student yearbook
 Education about Asia – Educational magazine
 Sequoya Review – Literary magazine
 Modern Psychological Studies – Journal published by the Department of Psychology

Radio
 WUTC
 The Perch – Student-run online radio station

Research
SimCenter is UTC's computational engineering and simulation center. In November 2005, SimCenter was listed as the 89th most powerful supercomputer by Top500. On November 20, 2007, the university announced the center has been named a National Center for Computational Engineering. More recently, The SimCenter provided the academic research for a new source of alternative energy unveiled by Bloom Energy Corporation in Sunnyvale, California.

The Clinical Infectious Disease Control Research Unit is a research interest group composed of UTC faculty, students, and local partners. Members of the CIDC have had their research published in peer-reviewed journals, as well as presented at professional meetings and conferences. More information on their current projects and recent events can be found on UTC's website.

Campus
The university is served by CARTA bus routes 4, 7, 10, 14, 19, and 28.  Route 14 only operates on weekdays during fall and spring terms, when the university is session. The route runs on and off the campus on McCallie, Houston, Vine, Douglas, Fifth, and Palmetto Streets. A recent extension serves Third, O'Neal, and Central Streets, as well as Erlanger Hospital, and a large parking lot at Engel Stadium. All students showing valid University identification cards (MocsCards) ride for free on all CARTA routes, year-round.

Academic buildings
Note: Dates of construction given when known

 Administration Building  – mailroom, parking services, motor pool and university police department.
 Brenda Lawson Student Athlete Success Center – opened in August 2008, houses the Wolford Family Strength and Conditioning Center and the Chattem Basketball Center.
 Bretske Hall – Formerly the university cafeteria, prior home of the Geology Department.
 Brock Hall – Foreign languages, geography, anthropology, history and sociology departments.
 Challenger Center – The widow of Dick Scobee, a Challenger astronaut, donated the building in her husband's memory. This educational simulation includes different space missions with project completed from mission control and a space station.
 Cadek Hall (pronounced "CHAH-dik") – Home to the Cadek Conservatory and the UTC Choral Department.
 Davenport Hall – Criminal Justice, Social Work, and Physical Therapy Departments.
 Derthick Hall - Amphitheater and lecture hall.
 Engineering, Mathematics and Computer Science Building (EMCS)
 Fletcher Hall – (1939) Business Administration and Political Science departments.  From 1939 to 1974, Fletcher housed both the local public library and the university library.
 Founders' Hall – (1916) Chancellor's offices, University Relations.
 Frist Hall – Disability Resource Center, MoSAIC Program, Communication Department, Student Support Services.  Once part of the Chattanooga metro hospital complex.
 Grote Hall (pronounced "GROW-tee") – (1968) Chemistry, Geology, and physics departments.
 Guerry Center (pronounced "GEH-ree") – Formerly the University Student Center, this building now houses the University Honors program and Reading Room, Economics Department, and Crossroads Cafe. This building underwent a major renovation in the summer of 2019 from the historic "Guerry Hall" building constructed in 1957.
 Holt Hall – Biology, English, Philosophy, Psychology, and Religion departments.
 Hooper-Race Hall – (1916) Records and registration, financial aid, human resources, and research and sponsored programs departments. Recently, Hooper Hall reopened after a lead and asbestos abatement project.
 Hunter Hall - Education Department.
 Lupton Library – (1974) see below.
 Metropolitan Hall – Formerly the home of the Tepper Clinic and Chattanooga Metropolitan Hospital, this building now houses the Nursing department.
 Old Math Building – This building was originally constructed as a home for the Chattanooga Medical College. After that college was disbanded around 1917, the building served many different purposes to the university. It was demolished in the late 1990s and a Student Park was built in its place.
 President's House – Development (fundraising) Department.
 Patten House – (1893) Located in the Fort Wood National Historic District. Home of the Alumni Affairs Department.
 Dorothy Patten Fine Arts Center – (1980) Houses the Dorothy Hackett Ward theatre, the Roland W. Hayes Concert Hall and the George Ayers Cress Art Gallery, referred to as the "FAC." Also houses the UTC Music and Theater Departments.
 University Center – Home of the University Bursar's Office, the building also include student recreation facilities and a game room, offices for student organizations, food court, bookstore, classrooms and auditoriums, administrative areas include meeting rooms, administrative offices for the student development division, counseling and career planning, women's center, student placement and employment, and cooperative education.
 University Hall – (1886) "Old Main." Demolished in 1917.

Patten Chapel

 Patten Chapel is one of the busiest sanctuaries in Chattanooga. Mostly weddings and memorial services are held there. A bride's room has been prepared and is always ready. Reserving the chapel should be done around a year in advance as its popularity sees events almost every weekend. Wedding receptions are not hosted at the chapel.

Library
The Lupton Memorial Library, named for T. Cartter and Margaret Rawlings Lupton, was constructed in 1974 to replace the aging John Storrs Fletcher Library (which has since been restored and renamed Fletcher Hall). As of 2005, the library's collection includes nearly 2 million items, including the Fellowship of Southern Writers archives. In early 2008 the university was granted funding to build a new library.

The university broke ground in 2010 for the new $48 million  library. Construction was completed on the UTC Library in January 2015.

Athletics

Chattanooga's colors are navy and old gold; their men's teams and athletes are nicknamed Mocs, and women's teams and athletes are Lady Mocs. Chattanooga athletics teams compete in NCAA Division I (FCS for football) in the Southern Conference (SoCon) and have been ranked as a national top 100 athletic program by The National Association of Collegiate Director's of Athletics (NACDA) in the Division I Learfield Sports Director's Cup.

Basketball

Chattanooga's men's basketball program has been among the best in the Southern Conference since joining the league in 1977–78.  The Mocs have won 10 SoCon Tournament titles, tied for first all-time with former member West Virginia and Davidson, 10 regular-season league championships prior to the change to the division format in 1995 and seven division titles for 27 totals titles.  In 1997, led by coach Mack McCarthy and Chattanooga native Johnny Taylor, the Mocs made a run to the Sweet 16 as a No. 14 seed, beating Georgia and Illinois before falling to Providence.  Before making the move to Division I, Chattanooga won the Division II National Championship in 1977. In July 2008, the team was ranked number 48 on the ESPN list of the most prestigious basketball programs since the 1984–85 season.

The Mocs won the SoCon tournament once again in 2009.  Defeating the College of Charleston Cougars 80–69 in the championship game on their home court at the McKenzie Arena, the Mocs punched their ticket to the NCAA tournament, their first since 2005.

Jimmy Fallon from Late Night with Jimmy Fallon chose the Mocs as his team of choice going into the 2009 NCAA tournament.  The Wednesday night (March 18) show included a live Skype chat with Head Coach John Shulman, as well as representatives of the pep band and cheerleading squads made in studio.  Fallon's house band The Roots wrote and performed an ode to Shulman titled, "The Don Juan of the SoCon" and Shulman and his six seniors (Nicchaeus Doaks, Zach Ferrell, Kevin Goffney, Khalil Hartwell, Stephen McDowell and Keyron Sheard) made an in-studio appearance following their tournament game with UConn.

The Lady Mocs are the most successful women's basketball program in Southern Conference history with 15 regular season titles since 1983–1984, 10 consecutive conference championships at the end of 2008–2009 and 14 overall conference championships.

Golf
The men's golf squad won its third consecutive Southern Conference trophy and finished 18th in the NCAA Championships in 2009.

In August 2012, UTC golfer Steven Fox won the U.S. Amateur Championship.

Women's golf posted a 3.46 team GOA in the spring while advancing to the NCAA Division I finals in just the second year of the program since disbanding in the mid-1980s.

Softball
The Mocs’ softball team has won 11 regular season titles and 10 SoCon Tournament Championships.  They have also made 7 NCAA tournament appearances.

Wrestling
Chattanooga is home to the only NCAA Division I wrestling program in the state of Tennessee.  The Mocs' wrestling team has won 8 of the past 9 Socon title's since the 2012–2013 academic year.

Football

The team plays in the Southern Conference (SoCon) in Division I FCS (formerly I-AA). Hall of Famer Terrell Owens played wide receiver for the Mocs from 1992 to 1995. The team won three-straight SoCon championships from 2013 to 2015. They play in Finley Stadium, which hosted the NCAA Division I Football Championship from 1997 to 2009.

In 2021, the team fired its offensive line coach, Chris Malone, for a social media post that was derogatory about Georgia and Civil Rights leader Stacey Abrams.

Athletic venues
 Chamberlain Field – (1908–1997)
 Finley Stadium – (1997–present)
 Maclellan Gymnasium and natatorium – (Gym opened 1961; natatorium opened 1968)
 McKenzie Arena – (1982–present) aka the Roundhouse, due to its circular shape and the city's association with the railroad industry.

University nickname
The school's athletic teams are called the Mocs.  The teams were nicknamed Moccasins until 1996.  (The origin of the name is uncertain; however, Moccasin Bend is a large horseshoe-shaped bend in the Tennessee River directly below Lookout Mountain.)

The mascot has taken on four distinct forms. A water moccasin was the mascot in the 1920s, and then a moccasin shoe (known as "The Shoe") was used as the school's mascot at times in the 1960s and 1970s.  From the 1970s until 1996, the mascot was Chief Moccanooga, an exaggerated Cherokee tribesman.

In 1996, the Moccasins name and image were dropped in favor of the shortened "Mocs" and an anthropomorphized northern mockingbird, in accordance with the state bird, named "Scrappy" dressed as a railroad engineer.  The school's main athletic logo features Scrappy riding a train (a reference to Chattanooga's history as a major railroad hub and to the song "Chattanooga Choo Choo").  The mascot takes its name from former football coach A. C. "Scrappy" Moore.

Fight song
The fight song for UTC is "Fight Chattanooga".

Band

The marching band is referred to as the "Marching Mocs" and performs at all home games.

Notable alumni, students, and faculty
 
 Hugh Beaumont, actor (most notably portrayed Ward Cleaver on Leave It to Beaver), 1927
 Burwell Baxter Bell, U.S. Army general, 1968
 Eldra Buckley, NFL football player, 2007
 Anthony Burger, pianist, 1966
 Bill Butler, former NFL player, 1958
 Dr. North Callahan, author and historian whose papers and book collection now reside in the UTC Lupton Library, 1930
 B.J. Coleman, former NFL player for the Green Bay Packers in 2012. Signed with the Saskatchewan Roughriders of the Canadian Football League (CFL) on January 25, 2016. 
 Steven Fox, golfer, 2012 U.S. Amateur champion
 Gibby Gilbert, PGA Tour professional golfer, 1963
 Antuan Edwards, NFL football player
 Willie Earl Gillespie, USFL and NFL football player
 Irvine W. Grote, chemist, inventor of the active ingredient in Rolaids and Bufferin, UC 1918; chemistry faculty, 1942–1969
 Dennis Haskins, actor (most notably portrayed Mr. Belding on Saved By The Bell), 1972
 Tony Hill, NFL and CFL football player, 1990
 Brent Johnson, NFL football player, 1986
 Leslie Jordan, Emmy-winning actor, 1982
 Mindaugas Katelynas, basketball player, 2005
Mathew Knowles, music executive, transferred to Fisk University
 David F. Levine, pioneer in canine rehabilitation and physical therapy, author, physical therapy professor, 1990–present
 Chris Lewis-Harris, NFL football player (Cincinnati Bengals), 2011
 Charlie Long, basketball player, football player (NFL/AFL ALL-Pro)
 Lanni Marchant, long-distance runner, 2007
 Khaled Mattawa, poet and writer, 1989
 Tre McLean (born 1993), basketball player in the Israeli Basketball Premier League, 2017
 Barry Moser, artist and professor, 1962
 Terrell Owens, Hall-of-fame NFL football player, basketball player. Selected in the third round of the 1996 NFL Draft by the San Francisco 49ers.
 Cherie Priest, author, 2001
 Lorine Livingston Pruette, psychologist, 1918
 Curtis Rouse, former NFL football player, 1982
 Lewis Smith, actor North and South. Also the Heavenly Kid, 1979
 Buster Skrine, NFL football player (Cleveland Browns, New York Jets), 2011
 Cole Strange, football player for New England Patriots, 2022
 Johnny Taylor, former NBA basketball player, 1997. Drafted in the first round, 17th pick
 Bo Watson, Member of Tennessee State Senate, 1983
 Pez Whatley, football player and UTC's first black wrestler, later became a pro wrestler
 Dr. William White, academic of journalism and bibliographer, 1933
 Willie White, former NBA basketball player, 1984
 Gerald Wilkins, former NBA basketball player, 1984
 Julius C. Zeller, Mississippi senator, 1893

References

External links
 
 Distinguished Alumnus/Alumna Award (1969-2018) at University of Tennessee at Chattanooga website

 
Universities and colleges in Chattanooga, Tennessee
Universities and colleges accredited by the Southern Association of Colleges and Schools
University of Tennessee Chattanooga
Educational institutions established in 1886
1886 establishments in Tennessee
Universities and colleges formed by merger in the United States
Chattanooga